Albert Akst (August 31, 1899 – April 19, 1958) was an American musician turned film editor, played saxophone in Meyer Davis Orchestra and in vaudeville until 1930. He became a film cutter of short subjects and later became an editor on 53 feature films, including Forbidden Passage, Johnny Eager, Ziegfeld Follies, Summer Stock, Brigadoon and Meet Me in Las Vegas. He was nominated for an Academy Award for his work on Somebody Up There Likes Me.

Akst was born in New Jersey and died in Los Angeles, California.

Selected filmography

References

External links 
 

1899 births
1958 deaths
Musicians from New Jersey
American film editors
Burials at Hollywood Forever Cemetery
American male saxophonists
20th-century American saxophonists
20th-century American male musicians